Sinj is a town in the continental part of Split-Dalmatia County, Croatia. The town itself has a population of 11,478 and the population of the administrative municipality, which includes surrounding villages, is 24,826 (2011).

Geography

Sinj is located in the heart of the Dalmatian hinterland, the area known as Cetinska krajina, a group of settlements situated on a fertile karstic field of Sinjsko polje through which the river Cetina passes. Sinj lies between four mountains: Svilaja, Dinara, Kamešnica and Visoka. Those mountains give Sinj its specific submediterranean climate (hotter summers and colder winters).

History
Sinj was seized by the Turks in 1524 who maintained control until 1686, when it was taken into possession by the Venetians. The town grew around an ancient fortress held by the Ottomans from 16th until the end of 17th century, and the Franciscan monastery with the church of Our Lady of Sinj, a place of pilgrimage.
The last Turkish siege in 1715, during the Second Morean War, was repelled.

After the Congress of Vienna in 1815 until 1918, the town (bilingual name SINJ - SIGN) was part of the Austrian monarchy (Austria side after the compromise of 1867), head of the district of the same name, one of the 13 Bezirkshauptmannschaften in the Kingdom of Dalmatia. The Italian name alone was used before 1867.

Demographics

Tourism

Sinj and Cetinska Krajina represent an interesting tourist area, and the major attraction is certainly the traditional Tilters Tournament of Sinj (Sinjska alka). It takes place every year on the first Sunday in August to commemorate the victory over the Turkish army in 1715. The tilters, dressed in the traditional costumes, ride on horseback in full gallop, trying to thrust a small ring (alka), hanging from a wire, with a lance. The tilter who scores the highest number of points (punat) is declared the victor.

The Museum of the Cetinska Krajina Region is in Sinj.

International relations

Twin towns — Sister cities
Sinj is twinned with:

Notable natives and residents
 Vladimir Beara, footballer
 Stipe Breko, singer
 Ivica Buljan, theatre director
 Ivan Klapez, sculptor
 Leo Lemešić, footballer
 Vedran Runje, footballer 
 Zlatko Runje, footballer
 Ante Vukušić, footballer
 Mateo Barać, footballer

See also

 Franciscan Grammar School of Sinj

References

External links

 Sinj Airport
 Sinj Tourist Board 
 First news portal of Sinj town 
 Sinj News and Events 
 Virtual reality 

Cities and towns in Croatia
Populated places in Split-Dalmatia County
Kingdom of Dalmatia